Lambengolmor may be
the Quenya term for "philologists", see Elvish languages (Middle-earth)
a mailing list dedicated to Tolkienian linguistics, see Languages_of_Arda#Reception_and_study